The Anchor Skysuites is a residential skyscraper at the Binondo district in Manila, Philippines.

Construction
The building had its launching in February 2011. The topped-off ceremony for the building took place on December 1, 2014.

Architecture and design
Albert Yu of Asya Design Partner was responsible for the architectural design of the Anchor Skysuites. The design of the building was derived from organic architecture. Its biomorphic form is designed to utilize air and sunlight to reduce the energy consumption of the building. The windows were provided by German firm, Lemmens.

For the structural engineering of the Binondo skyscraper, Jose "Boy" Sy and Naveed Anwar of the Asian Institute of Technology were responsible. The Anchor Skysuites was also evaluated to have high earthquake resistance. The façade of the building was painted waterproof paints from UKUSA which were imported from the United Kingdom.

The building's architectural height is  while its highest floor that can be occupied is at  making it the tallest building in Manila Chinatown and is claimed by its developers to be the tallest building in the world situated within a Chinatown outside China. There are 56 designated floors for the building with the 13th, 14th, 34th, 44th, and 54th floors skipped and the ground, mezzanine and 1st floors being three separate floors. Thus the building which also has a single basement level has 53 physical floors above ground.

The units of the residential building is also oriented towards the southern direction a decision guided by Feng shui tradition.

Features
The Anchor Skysuites as a residential condominium have 346 units. Among its amenities are a basketball half-court, a full badminton court, a table tennis room, a billiards room, a gymnasium, a  lap swimming pool and children's pool, a garden lounge and café, bar, golfer's rest area, mini-theater, a dance studio, and karaoke rooms,

References

Skyscrapers in Manila
Buildings and structures in Binondo
Residential buildings completed in 2015
Residential skyscrapers in Metro Manila